Christopher D. Kelleher (born March 23, 1975) is a retired American professional ice hockey defenseman. He played one game in the National Hockey League, with the Boston Bruins on March 16, 2002 against the Detroit Red Wings. The rest of his career, which lasted from 1998 to 2007, was mainly spent in the minor American Hockey League. After retiring he became a scout with the Minnesota Wild.

Biography
As a youth, Kelleher played in the 1989 Quebec International Pee-Wee Hockey Tournament with the Boston Junior Bruins minor ice hockey team.

He later played in one National Hockey League game for the Boston Bruins during the 2001–02 NHL season. He officially retired from professional hockey during the 2006-07 season due to a knee injury.

He is currently Director of Pro Scouting for the Minnesota Wild.

Career statistics

Regular season and playoffs

International

Awards and honors

See also
List of players who played only one game in the NHL

References

External links

1975 births
Living people
American men's ice hockey defensemen
Boston Bruins players
Boston University Terriers men's ice hockey players
Ice hockey people from Massachusetts
Krefeld Pinguine players
Linköping HC players
Minnesota Wild scouts
NCAA men's ice hockey national champions
Pittsburgh Penguins draft picks
Providence Bruins players
Sportspeople from Cambridge, Massachusetts
Syracuse Crunch players
Wilkes-Barre/Scranton Penguins players
AHCA Division I men's ice hockey All-Americans
Ice hockey players from Massachusetts